Marin José Guimaraens (born 1 February 1987) is a Paraguayan international footballer.

References

1987 births
Living people
Paraguayan footballers
Paraguayan expatriate footballers
Paraguay international footballers
Serie B players
Venezia F.C. players
Expatriate footballers in Italy
Association football defenders